Mastertronic Group Limited was a software publisher formed as a result of a merger between The Producers and Sold Out Sales & Marketing in 2004. Frank Herman, one of the founders of the original Mastertronic and former chairman of Sega Europe, was involved in negotiations to buy back the name from Sega in 2003. Frank Herman died in 2009 and the company was run by MD Andy Payne and Garry Williams.

Mastertronic Group licensed, published and distributed value PC software under the Sold Out, M.A.D. and PC Gamer Presents labels. They also owned the Everyone Can Play and Great Indie Games labels. Mastertronic closed in November 2015.

History
Mastertronic Group Limited was formed in 2004 out of a merger between The Producers Limited and Sold Out Sales & Marketing Limited. The 'Sold Out' label was retained and used to sell software at the £5 (frequently "3-for-£10") price-point. The company also distributed software under the original 'M.A.D.' imprint, as well as another label associated with PC Gamer magazine. Games on these labels were typically sold for £10 (or "3-for-£20").

Just Flight and Just Trains, both specialist simulation publishers were acquired by the Mastertronic Group in 2008.

In 2009, Mastertronic Group started the Great Indie Games publishing label to spread independent games, only available on the internet, to shops. Later that year, Mastertronic Group founder Andy Payne entered into a joint venture with Rupert Loman MD of Eurogamer Network and formed Get Games Go (known as Get Games) to market and sell PC games by direct download.

In early 2014, in response to the changing games industry, the Group focused efforts on its publishing activities. As part of the process, the sales team were spun out to re-form Sold Out Sales & Marketing Ltd led by Garry Williams and James Cato. Mastertronic Group had also become the sole owner and operator of Get Games.

Business units
Mastertronic Group had five business units; Mastertronic Games, The Producers (manufacturing and fulfilment), Just Flight (Flight and Train Simulations), Blast Entertainment, and Get Games.

Mastertronic Games
Published PC & console games under a range of labels including PC Gamer Presents, M.A.D., Sold Out, Everyone Can Play and Great Indie Games. Recently the brand has increased output of indie-developed digital titles such as 10 Second Ninja, Epanalepsis, 0RBITALIS, Tango Fiesta, Richard & Alice and Concursion.

Get Games
An online retail outlet for digital-download PC/Mac/Linux games from a number of various publishers, both large and small. Get Games also offered periodic bundle sales under the Get Loaded brand.

Just Flight & Just Trains
Publishes and develops add-on content for the major flight simulation packages such as Microsoft Flight Simulator, Lockheed Martin Prepar3D and X-Plane (simulator). The internal development team recently completed work on its English Electric Canberra PR9 add-on and has begun development of a Panavia Tornado add-on.

In a similar vein to Just Flight, Just Trains publishes and develops add-on content for train simulation packages, primarily RailWorks (Train Simulator).

The Producers
Provided manufacturing, fulfilment and distribution services to the group and third parties.

Blast! Entertainment
Blast! Entertainment was a publishing joint-venture between Mastertronic and Disky Communications that published budget-priced, licensed video games for the PlayStation 2, PlayStation Portable, PC, Wii, and Nintendo DS aimed at young game players. The partnership was announced in April 2006.

Sold Out
A publishing label that published indie games.

References

External links

Official websites
 
 
 
 
 
 

Defunct video game companies of the United Kingdom
Video game companies established in 2004
Video game companies disestablished in 2015